VfB Friedrichshafen Volleyball GmbH is a German professional men's volleyball club founded in 1969 and based in Friedrichshafen, southern Baden-Württemberg. Main stakeholder is VfB Friefdrichshafen e.V. The club plays in the German Bundesliga and the CEV Champions League. 

The team won the 2006–07 CEV Champions League title. From 2005 to 2011 they won the German league seven times in a row. In total, VfB Friedrichshafen won the championship 13 times and the German cup 17 times. 

Just before the start of the 2020–21 season the city of Friedrichshafen announced the ZF Arena, home of VfB Friedrichshafen since 2004, is closed immediately due to possible rust in the roof structure. After being forced to train in small gyms and to swap home games with the opponents, VfB Friedrichshafen moved to Zeppelin Cat Hall A1 which is a hall of the Friedrichshafen fair. The first match in the new arena was against Berlin Recycling Volleys, and took place on 21 November 2020.

History

Currently, the club has about 3,500 members in 23 sections and 30 disciplines, making it the largest multi-discipline and multi-generational club in Friedrichshafen and one of the largest in Baden-Württemberg. VfB Friedrichshafen sees itself as a sports club for all social groups. With its diverse range of sports, it is a lifelong promoter of health, exercise and sport and, through the cultivation of social togetherness, an essential social pillar of the common good in Friedrichshafen. The men's main volleyball team is the most successful team in the Bundesliga. 

Continuously playing in the 1st Volleyball Bundesliga since 1987, they have won the German Championship 13 times, the German Cup 17 times and the German Supercup three times. In 2007 they won the Champions League. In 2000, VfB Friedrichshafen Volleyball GmbH, a commercial enterprise, was founded to realize the separation of the professionals from the amateurs. The team of the badminton section also played in the first Bundesliga. In addition, there are 21 other sections, including the soccer team, which also played in the first division in the 1930s and 1940s. The club has a full-time office, but is run on a voluntary basis. 

Jochen Benz has been president since December 21, 2022.

Honours

Domestic
 Volleyball Bundesliga
Winners (13): 1997–98, 1998–99, 1999–2000, 2000–01, 2001–02, 2004–05, 2005–06, 2006–07, 2007–08, 2008–09, 2009–10, 2010–11, 2014–15

 German Cup
Winners (17): 1997–98, 1998–99, 2000–01, 2001–02, 2002–03, 2003–04, 2004–05, 2005–06, 2006–07, 2007–08, 2011–12, 2013–14, 2014–15, 2016–17, 2018–19, 2021–22

 German SuperCup
Winners (3): 2015–16, 2016–17, 2017–18

International
 CEV Champions League
Winners (1): 2006–07

 CEV European Champions Cup
Silver (1): 1999–2000

CEV Challenge Cup
Bronze (1): 1993–94

Team
As of 2022–23 season

References

External links
 Official website 
 Team profile at Volleybox.net

German volleyball clubs
Sport in Baden-Württemberg
Volleyball clubs established in 1969
1969 establishments in Germany